Evgeny Ketov (born January 17, 1986) is a Russian professional ice hockey player. He currently plays for SKA Saint Petersburg in the Kontinental Hockey League (KHL).

Ketov made his KHL debut playing with HC Lada Togliatti during the inaugural 2008–09 KHL season.

Career statistics

International

Awards and honors

References

External links
 

1986 births
Living people
Ak Bars Kazan players
HC CSK VVS Samara players
HC Lada Togliatti players
Russian ice hockey right wingers
Severstal Cherepovets players
SKA Saint Petersburg players
Sportspeople from Perm, Russia